The men's K-1 500 metres event was an individual kayaking event conducted as part of the Canoeing at the 1988 Summer Olympics program.

Medalists

Results

Heats
The 18 competitors first raced in three heats on September 26. The top three finishers from each of the heats advanced directly to the semifinals with the rest competing in the repechages.

Repechages
Taking place on September 26, the top four finishers from the second repechage advanced to the semifinals. The first repechage was scheduled, but not held since there were only three competitors. One competitor was disqualified in the second repechage for reasons not disclosed in the official report.

Semifinals
The top three finishers in each of the three semifinals (raced on September 28) advanced to the final.

Philipp's reason for not starting was not disclosed in the official report.

Final
The final was held on September 30.

References
1988 Summer Olympics official report Volume 2, Part 2. pp. 336–7. 
Sports-reference.com 1988 men's K-1 500 m results

Men's K-1 500
Men's events at the 1988 Summer Olympics